Marquirivi is a small town in Bolivia. In 2014, the town received adequate plumbing in the summer of 2014, thanks to an organization known as, "Club Tunari Cochabamba with Engineers in Action."

References

http://rotaryclubtunari.com/2014/07/29/718/

Populated places in La Paz Department (Bolivia)